This is a list of schools in Gloucestershire, England.

State-funded schools

Primary schools 

Abbeymead Primary School, Abbeymead
Amberley Parochial School, Amberley
Ampney Crucis CE Primary School, Ampney Crucis
Andoversford Primary School, Andoversford
Ann Cam CE Primary School, Dymock
Ann Edwards CE Primary School, South Cerney
Ashchurch Primary School, Ashchurch
Ashleworth CE Primary School, Ashleworth
Avening Primary School, Avening
Aylburton CE Primary School, Aylburton
Barnwood CE Primary School, Barnwood
Beech Green Primary School, Quedgeley
Benhall Infant School, Benhall
Berkeley Primary School, Berkeley
Berry Hill Primary School, Berry Hill
Bibury CE Primary School, Bibury
Birdlip Primary School, Birdlip
Bishop's Cleeve Primary Academy, Bishop's Cleeve
Bisley Blue Coat CE Primary School, Bisley
Blakeney Primary School, Blakeney
Bledington Primary School, Bledington
Blockley CE Primary School, Blockley
Blue Coat CE Primary School, Wotton-under-Edge
Bourton-on-the-Water Primary School, Bourton-on-the-Water
Bream CE Primary School, Bream
Brimscombe CE Primary School, Brimscombe
The British School, Wotton-under-Edge
Brockworth Primary Academy, Brockworth
Bromesberrow St Mary's CE Primary School, Bromesberrow
Bussage CE Primary School, Bussage
Callowell Primary School, Stroud
Calton Primary School, Gloucester
Cam Everlands Primary School, Cam
Cam Hopton CE Primary School, Cam
Cam Woodfield Infant School, Cam
Cam Woodfield Junior School, Cam
Carrant Brook Junior School, Northway
Cashes Green Primary School, Cashes Green
Castle Hill Primary School, Brockworth
Chalford Hill Primary School, Chalford Hill
The Catholic School of Saint Gregory the Great, Cheltenham
Charlton Kings Infants' School, Charlton Kings
Charlton Kings Junior School, Charlton Kings
Chesterton Primary School, Chesterton
Christ Church CE Primary School, Cheltenham
Churcham Primary School, Churcham
Churchdown Parton Manor Infant School, Churchdown
Churchdown Parton Manor Junior School, Churchdown
Churchdown Village Infant School, Churchdown
Churchdown Village Junior School, Churchdown
Cirencester Primary School, Cirencester
Clearwater CE Primary Academy, Quedgeley
Clearwell CE Primary School, Clearwell
Coaley CE Primary Academy, Coaley
Coalway Community Infant School, Coleford
Coalway Junior School, Coleford
Coberley CE Primary School, Coberley
Cold Aston CE Primary School, Cold Aston
Coney Hill Community Primary School, Gloucester
Coopers Edge School, Brockworth
Cotswold Chine School, Box
Cranham CE Primary School, Cranham
The Croft Primary School, Painswick
Deerhurst and Apperley CE Primary School, Apperley
Dinglewell Infant School, Hucclecote
Dinglewell Junior School, Hucclecote
Down Ampney CE Primary School, Down Ampney
Drybrook Primary School, Drybrook
Dunalley Primary School, Cheltenham
Dursley CE Primary Academy, Dursley
Eastcombe Primary School, Eastcombe
Eastington Primary School, Eastington
Ellwood Primary School, Ellwood
Elmbridge Primary School, Gloucester
English Bicknor CE Primary School, English Bicknor
Fairford CE Primary School, Fairford
Field Court CE Infant Academy, Quedgeley
Field Court Junior School, Quedgeley
Finlay Community School, Gloucester
Forest View Primary School, Cinderford
Foxmoor Primary School, Cashes Green
Gardners Lane Primary School, Cheltenham
Gastrells Community Primary School, Stroud
Glebe Infants' School, Newent
Glenfall Community Primary School, Charlton Kings
Gloucester Road Primary School, Cheltenham
Gotherington Primary School, Gotherington
Grange Primary School, Gloucester
Grangefield Primary School, Bishop's Cleeve
Great Oldbury Primary Academy, Great Oldbury
Greatfield Park Primary School, Up Hatherley
Gretton Primary School, Gretton
Hardwicke Parochial Academy, Hardwicke
Haresfield CE Primary School, Haresfield
Harewood Infant School, Gloucester
Harewood Junior School, Gloucester
Hartpury CE Primary School, Hartpury
Hatherley Infant School, Gloucester
Hatherop CE Primary School, Hatherop
Hempsted Primary School, Hempsted
Heron Primary School, Abbeydale
Hesters Way Primary School, Cheltenham
Highnam CE Primary Academy, Highnam
Hillesley CE Primary School, Hillesley
Hillview Primary School, Hucclecote
Holy Apostles' CE Primary School, Charlton Kings
Holy Trinity CE Primary School, Cheltenham
Hope Brook CE Primary School, Longhope
Horsley CE Primary School, Horsley
Huntley CE Primary School, Huntley
Hunts Grove Primary Academy, Hunts Grove
Innsworth Infant School, Innsworth
Innsworth Junior School, Innsworth
Isbourne Valley School, Didbrook
The John Moore Primary School, Walton Cardiff
Kemble Primary School, Kemble
Kempsford CE Primary School, Kempsford
King's Stanley CE Primary School, King's Stanley
Kingsholm CE Primary School, Gloucester
Kingsway Primary School, Kingsway Village
Kingswood Primary School, Kingswood
Lakefield CE Primary School, Frampton on Severn
Lakeside Primary School, Cheltenham
Leckhampton CE Primary School, Leckhampton
Leighterton Primary School, Leighterton
Leonard Stanley CE Primary School, Leonard Stanley
Linden Primary School, Gloucester
Littledean CE Primary School, Littledean
Longborough CE Primary School, Longborough
Longford Park Primary Academy, Longford
Longlevens Infant School, Longlevens
Longlevens Junior School, Longlevens
Longney CE Primary Academy, Longney
Lydbrook Primary School, Lydbrook
Lydney CE Primary School, Lydney
Meadowside Primary School, Quedgeley
Meysey Hampton CE Primary School, Meysey Hampton
Mickleton Primary School, Mickleton
Minchinhampton Primary Academy, Minchinhampton
Miserden CE Primary School, Miserden
Mitcheldean Endowed Primary School, Mitcheldean
Mitton Manor Primary School, Tewkesbury
Moat Primary School, Matson
Nailsworth CE Primary School, Nailsworth
Naunton Park Primary School, Cheltenham
Newnham St Peter's CE Primary School, Newnham on Severn
North Cerney CE Primary Academy, North Cerney
North Nibley CE Primary School, North Nibley
Northleach CE Primary School, Northleach
Northway Infant School, Northway
Norton CE Primary School, Norton
Oak Hill CE Primary School, Alderton
Oakridge Parochial School, Stroud
Oakwood Primary School, Cheltenham
Offa's Mead Academy, Sedbury
Park Junior School, Stonehouse
Parkend Primary School, Parkend
Pauntley CE Primary School, Pauntley
Picklenash Junior School, Newent
Pillowell Community Primary School, Pillowell
Powell's CE Primary School, Cirencester
Prestbury St Mary's CE Junior School, Prestbury
Primrose Hill CE Primary Academy, Lydney
Queen Margaret Primary School, Tewkesbury
Randwick CE Primary School, Randwick
Redbrook CE Primary School, Redbrook
Redmarley CE Primary School, Redmarley D'Abitot
The Rissington School, Upper Rissington
Robinswood Primary Academy, Matson
Rodborough Community Primary School, Rodborough
Rodmarton School, Rodmarton
The Rosary RC Primary School, Stroud
Rowanfield Infant School, Rowanfield
Rowanfield Junior School, Rowanfield
Ruardean CE Primary School, Ruardean
St Andrew's CE Primary School, Chedworth
St Briavels Parochial CE Primary School, St Briavels
St Catherine's RC Primary School, Chipping Campden
St David's CE Primary School, Moreton-in-Marsh
St James and Ebrington CE Primary School, Chipping Campden
St James CE Junior School, Gloucester
St James' CE Primary School, Cheltenham
St John's CE Academy, Coleford
St John's CE Primary School, Cheltenham
St Joseph's RC Primary School, Nympsfield
St Lawrence CE Primary School, Lechlade
St Mark's CE Junior School, Benhall
St Mary's CE Infant School, Prestbury
St Mary's CE Primary School, Tetbury
St Mary's RC Primary School, Churchdown
St Matthew's CE Primary School, Cainscross
St Paul's CE Primary School, Gloucester
St Peter's RC Primary School, Gloucester
St Thomas More RC Primary School, Cheltenham
St Whites's Primary School, Cinderford
Sapperton CE Primary School, Sapperton
Severnbanks Primary School, Lydney
Sharpness Primary School, Sharpness
Sheepscombe Primary School, Sheepscombe
Sherborne CE Primary School, Sherborne
Shurdington CE Primary School, Shurdington
Siddington CE Primary School, Siddington
Slimbridge Primary School, Slimbridge
Soudley School, Soudley
Southrop CE Primary School, Southrop
Springbank Primary Academy, Cheltenham
Staunton and Corse CE Primary School, Corse
Steam Mills Primary School, Steam Mills
Stone with Woodford CE Primary School, Stone
Stonehouse Park Infant School, Stonehouse
Stow-on-the-Wold Primary School, Stow-on-the-Wold
Stratton CE Primary School, Stratton
Stroud Valley Community Primary School, Stroud
Swell CE Primary School, Lower Swell
Swindon Village Primary School, Swindon Village
Temple Guiting CE School, Temple Guiting
Tewkesbury CE Primary School, Tewkesbury
Thrupp School, Thrupp
Tibberton Community Primary School, Tibberton
Tirlebrook Primary School, Tewkesbury
Tredington Community Primary School, Tredington
Tredworth Infant Academy, Gloucester
Tredworth Junior School, Gloucester
Tutshill CE Primary School, Tutshill
Twyning School, Twyning
Uley CE Primary School, Uley
Uplands Community Primary School, Stroud
Upton St Leonards CE Primary School, Upton St Leonards
Walmore Hill Primary School, Minsterworth
Warden Hill Primary School, Cheltenham
Watermoor CE Primary School, Cirencester
Waterwells Primary Academy, Quedgeley
Westbury-on-Severn CE Primary School, Westbury-on-Severn
Whiteshill Primary School, Whiteshill
Whitminster Endowed CE Primary School, Whitminster
Widden Primary School, Gloucester
Willersey CE Primary School, Willersey
The Willow Primary Academy, Gloucester
Winchcombe Abbey CE Primary School, Winchcombe
Withington CE Primary School, Withington
Woodchester Endowed CE Primary School, North Woodchester
Woodmancote School, Woodmancote
Woodside Primary School, Ruardean Woodside
Woolaston Primary School, Woolaston
Yorkley Primary School, Yorkley

Non-selective secondary schools 

All Saints' Academy, Cheltenham
Archway School, Stroud
Balcarras School, Charlton Kings
Barnwood Park School, Barnwood
Cheltenham Bournside School, Cheltenham
Chipping Campden School, Chipping Campden
Chosen Hill School, Churchdown
Churchdown School Academy, Churchdown
Cirencester Deer Park School, Cirencester
Cirencester Kingshill School, Cirencester
Cleeve School, Bishops Cleeve
The Cotswold School, Bourton-on-the-Water
The Dean Academy, Lydney
Dene Magna School, Mitcheldean
Farmor's School, Fairford
Five Acres High School, Coleford
The Forest High School, Cinderford
Gloucester Academy, Gloucester
Henley Bank High School, Gloucester
The High School Leckhampton, Leckhampton
Holmleigh Park High School, Gloucester
Katharine Lady Berkeley's School, Wotton-under-Edge
Maidenhill School, Stonehouse
Newent Community School, Newent
Pittville School, Cheltenham
Rednock School, Dursley
St Peter's High School, Gloucester
Severn Vale School, Quedgeley
SGS Berkeley Green UTC, Berkeley
Sir William Romney's School, Tetbury
Tewkesbury School, Tewkesbury
Thomas Keble School, Eastcombe
Winchcombe School, Winchcombe
Wyedean School, Sedbury

Grammar schools 
The Crypt School, Gloucester
Denmark Road High School, Gloucester
Marling School, Stroud
Pate's Grammar School, Cheltenham
Ribston Hall High School, Gloucester
Sir Thomas Rich's School, Longlevens
Stroud High School, Stroud

Special and alternative schools 

Abbey View, Tewkesbury
Alderman Knight School, Tewkesbury
Battledown Centre, Battledown
Belmont School, Cheltenham
Bettridge School, Cheltenham
Brook Academy, Brockworth
Gloucester and Forest Alternative Provision School, Gloucester
Gloucestershire Hospital Education Service, Cheltenham
Heart of the Forest Community Special School, Coleford
The Milestone School, Gloucester
Paternoster School, Cirencester
Peak Academy, Barton
The Ridge Academy, Whaddon
Severn Valley School, Stroud
The Shrubberies School, Stonehouse
Stroud and Cotswold Alternative Provision School, Stroud

Further education
Cirencester College
Gloucestershire College
Hartpury College
National Star College
South Gloucestershire and Stroud College

Independent schools

Primary and preparatory schools

Airthrie School, Cheltenham
Al-Ashraf Primary School, Gloucester
Beaudesert Park School, Minchinhampton
Berkhampstead School, Cheltenham
Dean Close St John's, Tutshill
Hatherop Castle School, Hatherop
Hopelands Preparatory School, Stonehouse
The Richard Pate School, Leckhampton
St Edward's Preparatory School, Charlton Kings

Senior and all-through schools

The Acorn School, Nailsworth
Al-Ashraf Secondary School for Girls, Gloucester
Cheltenham College, Cheltenham
Cheltenham Ladies' College, Cheltenham
Dean Close School, Cheltenham
Edward Jenner School, Gloucester
The King's School, Gloucester
OneSchool Global UK, Berkeley
OneSchool Global UK, Gloucester
Rendcomb College, Cirencester
St Edward's School, Charlton Kings
Westonbirt School, Westonbirt
Wotton House International School, Gloucester
Wycliffe College, Stonehouse

Special and alternative schools
Aurora Severnside School, Berkeley
Brookthorpe Hall School, Brookthorpe
Belong School Gloucestershire, Brookthorpe-with-Whaddon
Hartmore School, Hartpury
Norton College, Tewkesbury
St Rose's Special School, Stroud
William Morris School, Eastington

Gloucestershire
Schools in Gloucestershire
Schools